Prinsenlaan is a subway station on Rotterdam Metro lines A and B, and is situated in the northeastern part of Rotterdam, in Prins Alexander borough. The station is located between the neighbourhoods of Het Lage Land and Oosterflank.

This station was opened on 28 May 1983, when the East-West Line (also formerly the Caland line) was extended from its previous terminus Capelsebrug. This station lies on a section of line where overhead wires provide traction power.

Rotterdam Metro stations
Railway stations opened in 1983
1983 establishments in the Netherlands
Railway stations in the Netherlands opened in the 20th century